The Mont Blanc Trophy was an international figure skating competition held in February 2010 and 2011 in Courmayeur, Italy. It has included men's singles, ladies singles, pair skating, and ice dancing on the senior, junior and novice levels.

Senior medalists

Men

Ladies

Pairs

Ice dancing

Junior medalists

Men

Ladies

Ice dancing

Novice medalists

Men

Ladies

Ice dancing

References 
 2011 Mont Blanc Trophy results
 2010 Mont Blanc Trophy results

Figure skating competitions
Figure skating in Italy
Sport in Courmayeur